Events from the year 1485 in France

Incumbents
 Monarch – Charles VIII

Births

Full date missing
Jean Duvet, engraver and goldsmith (died after 1561).
Odet of Foix, Viscount of Lautrec, military leader (died 1528)
Nicolas Bachelier, surveyor, architect and mason (died 1557)
Antoine Vérard, publisher, bookmaker and bookseller (died 1512)
Nicolau Chanterene, sculptor and architect (died 1551)

Deaths

Full date missing
Françoise d'Amboise (born 1427)
André de Laval-Montmorency, Marshal of France (born c.1408)

See also

References

Links

1480s in France